Scott David Eade (born 19 October 1992) is a New Zealand rugby union player. He plays First five-eighth and occasionally Half-back.

References

External links
 itsrugby.co.uk profile
 espn.co.uk profile

1992 births
New Zealand rugby union players
Rugby union fly-halves
Rugby union scrum-halves
Living people
Highlanders (rugby union) players
Southland rugby union players
Otago rugby union players
Rugby union players from Invercargill